Louis Vorow Zborowski (20 February 1895 – 19 October 1924) was an English racing driver and automobile engineer, best known for creating a series of aero-engined racing cars known as the "Chitty-Bang-Bangs", which provided the inspiration for Ian Fleming's children's story, Chitty Chitty Bang Bang and culminated in the "Higham Special" which, much modified in the hands of John Godfrey Parry Thomas, broke the World Land Speed Record 18 months after the death of its creator.

Background
Louis Zborowski was born in 1895 in London to American parents, who had moved to England nine years earlier. His father, William Elliott Morris Zborowski (1858–1903), was also a racing driver, and died in a racing crash, in 1903 at La Turbie Hillclimb in Nice, France. His mother was a wealthy American heiress, born Margaret Laura Astor Carey (1853–1911), a granddaughter of William Backhouse Astor Sr. and Margaret Rebecca Armstrong of the prominent Astor family. She had been Madame de Stuers before her divorce and marriage in 1892 to Elliott Zborowski. On arriving in England, Elliott had assumed the title "Count" and was known generally as "Count Zborowski", although there is no firm evidence that he had any legitimate claim to any such title. Following Elliott's death, Louis assumed his father's fictitious title.

Early life

After the death of his father in 1903, in 1910 his mother bought the Higham Park estate at Bridge near Canterbury in Kent. Paying £17,500 to the executors of the estate of London banker William Gay, the sale included a farm,  and twelve houses. Mrs. Zborowski immediately commissioned a £50,000 refurbishment of the house from the architect Joseph Sawyer.

On her death in 1911, 16-year-old Louis instantly became the fourth richest under-21-year-old in the world, with cash of £11 million and real estate in the United States, including  of Manhattan and several blocks on Fifth Avenue, New York.

Early racing career
Zborowski's career as an amateur racing driver encompassed a wide experience of marques and events. He was an early patron of Aston Martin, and raced for them at Brooklands and in the 1922 French Grand Prix. In 1921 Zborowski was to drive one of the 1921 Grand Prix Sunbeams representing Britain at Le Mans but this did not transpire and instead he raced the car at the International Shelsley Walsh - England’s foremost Speed Hill-Climb.

Car designs

Zborowski designed and built four of his own racing cars in the stables at Higham Park, assisted by his engineer and co-driver Captain Clive Gallop, who was later racing engineer to the "Bentley Boys".

The first car was powered by a 23,093 cc six-cylinder Maybach aero engine and called "Chitty Bang Bang". A second "Chitty Bang Bang" was powered by 18,825 cc Benz aero engine. A third car was based on a Mercedes 28/95, but fitted with a 14,778 cc 6-cylinder Mercedes aero engine and was referred to as the White Mercedes. These cars achieved some success at Brooklands.

Another car, also built at Higham Park with a huge 27-litre American Liberty aero engine, was called the "Higham Special". After Zborowski's death the "Higham Special" was purchased by J.G. Parry-Thomas to make bids on the land speed record. Designer/driver Thomas improved the car and christened her "Babs". In April 1926 J.G. Parry-Thomas successfully took the Land Speed Record at over 170 mph at Pendine Sands. Thomas' second attempt at the same location in 1927 turned out fatal. At over 100 mph the car overturned and caught fire, killing the driver. "Babs" has been restored and can be seen either at the Pendine Sands museum of speed in the summer months or in the Brooklands Museum during other months of the year.

In January 1922 Louis, his wife Vi, Clive Gallop and Pixi Marix together with a couple of mechanics took Chitty Bang Bang 2 and the White Mercedes across the Mediterranean for a drive into the Sahara Desert, in the tracks of Citroën's Kégresse-track-equipped expedition.

Later career and death
In the 1923 Indianapolis 500 Zborowski drove a Bugatti. He drove in the 1923 Italian Grand Prix at Monza in a car designed by American engineer Harry Arminius Miller, the single-seat "American Miller 122".

Zborowski joined the Mercedes team in 1924 but died in one of their cars, after hitting a tree during the Italian Grand Prix at Monza. He was just 29 years old.

Legacy
Zborowski was a railway enthusiast and a  gauge railway circuit, the Higham Railway, was built around his estate in Kent. This line was part of the inspiration behind the joint decision by Zborowski and his racing friend Captain J. E. P. Howey to construct a long-distance passenger-carrying railway line in the same gauge. Zborowski ordered a steam locomotive from Bassett-Lowke, which ran on the Higham Railway in 1924. The locomotive was purchased by the Fairbourne Railway in Wales following the Zborowski's death and named "Count Louis" in his honour. (Zborowski's father had claimed the title of count.) The locomotive remained at the Fairbourne until 1988. Zborowski also ordered the first locomotives for the Romney, Hythe and Dymchurch Railway from Davey Paxman & Co. of Essex. The order (and the project) was continued by Capt Howey alone, following Zborowski's death.

The children's book by Ian Fleming, Chitty Chitty Bang Bang, and the subsequent musical film, were inspired by the romance of Zborowski's exploits. Fleming had watched Zborowski race at Brooklands as a school boy, and later visited Higham  Park (then known as Highland Court) as a friend of its later owner, Walter Whigham the chairman of Robert Fleming & Co. merchant bank founded by Ian's grandfather. In the third book, Zborowski is a major character, where his relationship to Chitty is explored and his future deadly crash is alluded to.

Indy 500 results

References

External links

Higham Park
Indy 500 stats for Zborowski
Profile at "Historic Racing"
Romney, Hythe and Dymchurch Railway
Louis Zborowski at Brooklands
Photo of Louis Zborowski and Clive Gallop

1895 births
1924 deaths
English racing drivers
Racing drivers who died while racing
Brooklands people
Indianapolis 500 drivers
Astor family
Livingston family
English people of German descent
English people of Irish descent
English people of Scottish descent
People from Bridge, Kent
Sport deaths in Italy
Aston Martin
Grand Prix drivers